Citrus pellets are an animal feed produced from byproducts of citrus processing.

Use
Used for feedstuff, especially for dairy cattle, fattened beef cattle and sheep.

Processing
They are produced from the peel, pulp and seeds of several species of citrus, dried, and processed with a binder (e.g., 1-3% of molasses, fat or colloidal clays), and extruded into pellets (typically 6 mm diameter; 2.5 cm max length).

See also
 Compound feed
 Fodder
 Pellet mill

External links
 Animal feed legislation and guidance
 Animal Feed and Ingredients Glossary

References

Fodder